Éva Tardos (born 1 October 1957) is a Hungarian mathematician and the Jacob Gould Schurman Professor of Computer Science at Cornell University.

Tardos's research interest is algorithms. Her work focuses on the design and analysis of efficient methods for combinatorial optimization problems on graphs or networks. She has done some work on network flow algorithms like approximation algorithms for network flows, cut, and clustering problems. Her recent work focuses on algorithmic game theory and simple auctions.

Education and career
Tardos received her Dipl. Math in 1981 and her Ph.D. 1984 from the Faculty of Sciences of the Eötvös Loránd University under her advisor András Frank. She was the Chair of the Department of Computer Science at Cornell from 2006-2010, and she is currently serving as the Associate Dean of the College of Computing and Information Science.

She was editor-in-Chief of SIAM Journal on Computing from 2004-2009, and is currently the Economics and Computation area editor of the Journal of the ACM as well as on the Board of Editors of Theory of Computing.

She has co-authored with Jon Kleinberg a textbook called Algorithm Design.

Honors and awards
Tardos has been elected to the National Academy of Engineering (2007), the American Academy of Arts and Sciences, and the National Academy of Sciences (2013) and the American Philosophical Society (2020)
She is also an ACM Fellow (since 1998), a Fellow of INFORMS, and a Fellow of the American Mathematical Society (2013)
She is the recipient of Packard, Sloan Foundation, and Guggenheim fellowships.

She is the winner of the Fulkerson Prize (1988),
the George B. Dantzig Prize (2006),
the Van Wijngaarden Award (2011),
the Gödel Prize (2012)
and the EATCS Award (2017),
In 2018 the Association for Women in Mathematics and Society for Industrial and Applied Mathematics selected her as their annual Sonia Kovalevsky Lecturer.
In 2019 she was awarded the IEEE John von Neumann Medal.

Personal
Tardos is married to David Shmoys. Gábor Tardos is her younger brother.

See also
Tardos function

References

External links
Eva Tardos on Google Scholar
 Cornell University: Eva Tardos, Department of Computer Science

20th-century Hungarian mathematicians
21st-century Hungarian mathematicians
Hungarian women computer scientists
Women mathematicians
Hungarian computer scientists
Cornell University faculty
Living people
1957 births
Fellows of the American Mathematical Society
Fellows of the Association for Computing Machinery
Fellows of the Institute for Operations Research and the Management Sciences
Fellows of the Society for Industrial and Applied Mathematics
Gödel Prize laureates
Members of the United States National Academy of Engineering
Members of the United States National Academy of Sciences
Hungarian people of Jewish descent
Hungarian women academics
Expatriate academics in the United States
Eötvös Loránd University alumni
Academic journal editors
Members of the American Philosophical Society
Theoretical computer scientists